This article lists political parties in Denmark.da

Denmark has a multi-party system, with two or three major parties complemented by several other significant parties. The government typically consists of a major party in coalition with, or supported by, a number of smaller parties. No party has won an outright majority since 1903. All governments since then have either been one-party minority governments or coalitions between two or more parties.da

The Ministry of the Interior and Housing registers and validates party names and the official party letters for all parties that participate in national elections. On ballots, the parties are sorted alphabetically by party letter.

Parties represented in the Folketing or the European Parliament

{| class ="wikitable sortable"
|-
! rowspan=2 class=unsortable | ElectionSymbol
! rowspan=2 | Party name
! colspan=2 | Representation
! rowspan=2 class="unsortable" | Ideology
! rowspan=2 class="unsortable" | Leader
|-
! Folketing(175/179 seats)
! MEPs(14/705 seats)

|- class="sortbottom"
| style="text-align:center;" | A
| Social Democrats,  
| 
| 
| Social democracy,  Democratic socialism
| Mette Frederiksen

|- class="sortbottom"
| style="text-align:center;" | V
| Venstre,  
| 
| 
| Conservative liberalism, Agrarianism (Nordic),Economic liberalism
| Jakob Ellemann-Jensen

|- class="sortbottom"
| style="text-align:center;" | M
| Moderates, 
| 
| 
| Liberalism, Reformism,  Pragmatism
| Lars Løkke Rasmussen

|- class="sortbottom"
| style="text-align:center;" | F
| Green Left, 
| 
| 
| Green politics,Democratic socialism
| Pia Olsen Dyhr

|- class="sortbottom"
| style="text-align:center;" |Æ
| The Denmark Democrats,   or:  
| 
| 
| Right-wing populismAnti-immigrationDecentralisation
| Inger Støjberg

|- class="sortbottom"
| style="text-align:center;" | I
| Liberal Alliance,  
| 
| 
| Classical liberalism,Right-libertarianism,Euroscepticism
| Alex Vanopslagh

|- class="sortbottom"
| style="text-align:center;" | C
| Conservative People's Party,  
| 
| 
| Conservatism, Green conservatism,Liberal conservatism
| Søren Pape Poulsen

|- class="sortbottom"
| style="text-align:center;" | Ø
| Red-Green Alliance,  {{small|Enhedslisten – De Rød-Grønne(Unity List – The Red-Greens)}}
| 
| 
| Democratic socialism,Eco-socialism,Soft euroscepticism
| Collective leadership|- class="sortbottom"
| style="text-align:center;" | B
| Danish Social Liberal Party,  
| 
| 
| Social liberalism,Pro-Europeanism
| Martin Lidegaard

|- class="sortbottom"
| style="text-align:center;" | O
| Danish People's Party,  
| 
| 
| Danish nationalism,National conservatism,Social conservatism
| Morten Messerschmidt

|- class="sortbottom"
| style="text-align:center;" | Å
| The Alternative,  
| 
| 
| Green politics,  Progressivism,  Pro-Europeanism
| Franciska Rosenkilde

|- class="sortbottom"
| style="text-align:center;" | D
| The New Right,  
| 
| 
| National conservatism,Economic liberalism,Hard euroscepticism
| Vacant|- class="sortbottom"
| style="text-align:center;" |   SP
| Union Party (Faroe Islands)
| 
| 
|
| Bárður á Steig Nielsen

|- class="sortbottom"
| style="text-align:center;" |IA
| Inuit Ataqatigiit
| 
| 
| 
| Múte Bourup Egede
 
|- class="sortbottom"
| style="text-align:center;" |  SIU
| Siumut
| 
| 
| 
| Erik Jensen

|- class="sortbottom"
| style="text-align:center;" | JF
| Social Democratic Party (Faroe Islands)
| 
| 
|
| Aksel V. Johannesen

|}

Parties without Folketing or European Parliament representation

Marginal parties

Local partiesSee List of regional and local political parties in Denmark''

Defunct parties

Formerly represented

The following lists defunct partiet that were previously represented in national parliament, in either the Folketing, Landsting or European Parliament.

Marginal parties

The following lists defunct parties that were never represented in national parliament.

See also

 Elections in Denmark
 Lists of political parties
 List of political parties in Greenland
 List of political parties in the Faroe Islands
 Liberalism and radicalism in Denmark
 Mink Commission
 :Category:Youth wings of political parties in Denmark
 Politics of Denmark
 2022 in Denmark

Notes

References

External links
 NSD: European Election Database - Political parties of Denmark

 
Denmark
Political parties
Political parties
Denmark